The Performance Aircraft Formula GT is an American homebuilt aircraft that was designed and produced by Performance Aircraft of Olathe, Kansas, introduced in the 1990s. When it was available the aircraft was supplied as a kit for amateur construction.

Design and development
The Formula GT features a cantilever low-wing, a two-seats-in-side-by-side configuration enclosed cockpit under a bubble canopy, fixed tricycle landing gear with wheel pants and a single engine in tractor configuration.

The aircraft is made from composite materials. The design includes dual side sticks and a large baggage compartment with its own external door.

The manufacturer estimated the construction time from the supplied kit as 1500 hours.

Operational history
In April 2015 one example was registered in the United States with the Federal Aviation Administration. It is powered by a Lycoming AEIO-540 engine.

Specifications (Formula GT)

References

External links
Photo of a Formula GT
Another photo of a Formula GT

Formula GT
1990s United States sport aircraft
1990s United States ultralight aircraft
1990s United States civil utility aircraft
Single-engined tractor aircraft
Low-wing aircraft
Homebuilt aircraft